Hindi Granth Karyalay is an Indian publishing house and specialized book store dealing in books pertaining to Jainology and Indology in English, Hindi, Sanskrit, Prakrit and Apabhramsha. It was established in Mumbai, India in 1912 by its founder Nathuram Premi. It publishes and distributes serials, monographs, and scholarly publications on Indian religions, philosophy, history, culture, arts, architecture, archaeology, language, literature, linguistics, musicology, mysticism, yoga, tantra, occult, medicine, astronomy, astrology and other related subjects, and to date have published over 100 works of noted Indian and International authors and scholars.

History

Establishment

On 24 September 1912, Pandit Nathuram Premi founded the publishing house Hindi Granth Ratnākar Kāryālay (now known as Hindi Granth Karyalay) at C.P. Tank, Mumbai. It was to become the foremost Hindi publishing house in India and is also the oldest bookstore of Mumbai. 
Born on 26 November 1881 in Deori, in the district of Sagar in Bundelkhand, Madhya Pradesh, Nāthūrām Premī was the eldest child of Tundelal Modi, a travelling merchant of modest means, belonging to the Paravāra community of Digambara Jains hailing from Bundelkhand. He arrived in Mumbai in 1901, and started working for the Digambara Jain Tīrthakṣetra Committee as a clerk. The owner of Hirabaug, Seth Manikchandra, impressed by his honesty, diligence and intellect asked the young Nāthūrām Premī to take up rooms at the Hirabaug Dharmashala at the heart of the Mumbai market and start his business from there. He accepted the offer and together with Pannalal Bakhliwal started the Jain Granth Ratnākar Kāryālay in 1906. From this humble beginnings, in 1912 he started the publishing house Hindi Granth Ratnākar Kāryālay.

Early history
The first publication of Hindi Granth Ratnākar Kāryālay was a Hindi translation of John Stuart Mill's Liberty, titled Svādhīnatā translated by Pandit Mahaviraprasad Dvivedi. They published almost the entire oeuvre of Sharat Chandra Chatterji, the great Bengali writer and some works of Rabindranath Tagore, such as Ānkh kī Kirkirī, and Naukā Dūbī. Premiji also published Hindi translations of the Gujarati writer KM Munshi, such as Gujarāt ke Nāth and Pātan kā Prabhutva. Other famous works published include Munshi Premchand's classic novel, Godān and short story collections titled Nava Nidhi and Sapta Saroj. He also published works of then new writers such as Hajariprasad Dvivedi, Jainendrakumar, Yashpal, Acharya Chatursen, and Pandit Sudarshan. He also published the Bengali plays of Dvijendra Lal Rai for the first time in Hindi.

In memory of Seth Manikchandra, Premiji established the Manikacandra Jain Granthamālā wherein he published Jain scriptures, for the first time systematically edited by philologists. The Manikacandra Jain Granthamālā published over 48 Digambara Jain texts, mostly written in Prakrit, Apabhramśa or Sanskrit. He ran the Manikacandra Jain Granthamālā on an honorary basis between 1915 and the 1950s selling all the books at cost price. When his health began to fail, it was decided to hand over the series to Bhāratīya Jñānapītha in Varanasi.

Current management 

Under Premiji’s tutelage, Hindi Granth Ratnākar Kāryālay became India's No. 1 publishers of Hindi literature. In recognition of his contributions to Indian literature, the acclaimed Hindi novelist Vishnu Prabhakar called Premiji the "Bhīsma Pitāmaha" of Hindi publishing.
Premiji had suffered from asthma for a long time and died owing to old age on 30 January 1960. He left behind his daughter-in-law and two grandsons. His elder grandson, Yashodhar Modi, continued his legacy till his death in 2014, along with his son, Manish Modi. Now Hindi Granth Karyalay is being managed by Premiji's great grandson Manish Modi. In Premiji's memory, his grandson Yashodhar Modi has started the Pandit Nathuram Premi Research Series. This series has published select volumes focusing on subjects as varied as Jainism, philosophy and yoga and published original texts by ancient and medieval Jain ascetics such as Kundakunda, Samantabhadra, Pūjyapāda, Joindu, Prabhācandra, Vādirāja, Bhāvadeva and many others, usually accompanied by translation in either Hindi or English. 
Also, highly respected modern scholars such as Premiji himself, Prof. Ludwig Alsdorf, Prof. Maurice Bloomfield, Prof. Willem Bollée and Dr. Jaykumar Jalaj have been and are being published in the Pandit Nathuram Premi Research Series.

Bookstore
Hindi Granth Karyalay's bookstore is located at 9 Hirabaug, C. P. Tank, Mumbai 400004. Besides housing its own published titles, Hindi Granth Karyalay also stocks, sells and distribute Indological literature of thousands of different titles.

Publications

Pandit Nathuram Premi Research Series

Jain Studies: Their Present State and Future Tasks
{English}
By Prof Dr Ludwig Alsdorf
English tr. by Bal Patil
Pandit Nathuram Premi Research Series Volume 1
Published in 2006

In reprint

The Story of Paesi
Based on the Rayapasenia Kaha
{Prakrit text + English commentary}
English tr. by Prof Dr Willem Bollée
Pandit Nathuram Premi Research Series Volume 2
Published in 2005

₹ 1200  

Ratnakaranda Shravakacara
{Sanskrit text + Hindi translation}
Sanskrit text by Acarya Samantabhadra
Hindi tr. by Dr Jaykumar Jalaj
Pandit Nathuram Premi Research Series Volume 3
Published in 2006, 2006, 2012

₹ 50

Vyavahara Bhashya Pithika
{Prakrit text + English commentary}
English tr. by Prof Dr Willem Bollée
Pandit Nathuram Premi Research Series Volume 4
Published in 2006, 2012

In reprint

Samadhitantra
{Sanskrit text + Hindi translation}
Sanskrit text by Acarya Pujyapada
Hindi tr. by Dr Jaykumar  Jalaj
Pandit Nathuram Premi Research Series Volume 5
Published in 2006, 2006, 2008, 2016

₹ 34  

 
Atthapahuda
{Prakrit text + Hindi translation}
Prakrit text by Acarya Kundakunda
Hindi tr. by Dr Jaykumar Jalaj
Pandit Nathuram Premi Research Series Volume 6
Published in 2006, 2008, 2013

₹ 125

Tattvarthasutra
{Sanskrit text + Hindi translation}
Sanskrit text by Acarya Prabhacandra
Hindi tr. by Dr Jaykumar Jalaj
Pandit Nathuram Premi Research Series Volume 7
Published in 2008

In reprint

Yogamrit : Yog Sahaj Jivan Vigyan
{Hindi}
By Mahavir Sainik
Pandit Nathuram Premi Research Series Volume 8
Published in 2006

Out of print

Paramatmaprakasha
{Apabhramsha text + Hindi translation}
Apabhramsa text by Acarya Joindu
Hindi tr. by Dr Jaykumar Jalaj
Pandit Nathuram Premi Research Series Volume 9
Published in 2007

In reprint  

Yogasara
{Apabhramsha text + Hindi translation}
Apabhramsa text by Acarya Joindu
Hindi tr. by Dr Jaykumar Jalaj
Pandit Nathuram Premi Research Series Volume 10
Published in 2007, 2009

₹ 30   

Dhyanastava
{Sanskrit text + Hindi translation}
Sanskrit text by Acarya Bhaskaranandi
Hindi tr. by Dr Jaykumar Jalaj
Pandit Nathuram Premi Research Series Volume 11
Published in 2007

In reprint     

Dhyanashataka
{Prakrit text + Hindi translation}
Prakrit text by Jinabhadragani Kshamashramana
Hindi tr. by Dr Jaykumar Jalaj
Published in 2007, 2009
Pandit Nathuram Premi Research Series Volume 12

In reprint      

Barasa Anuvekkha
{Prakrit text + Sanskrit translation + Hindi translation}
Prakrit text by Acarya Kundakunda
Sanskrit tr. & Hindi gloss by Pt. Nathuram Premi
Pandit Nathuram Premi Research Series Volume 13
Published in 2010

₹ 50     

Ishtopadesha
{Sanskrit text + Hindi translation}
Sanskrit text by Acarya Pujyapada
Hindi tr. by Dr Jaykumar Jalaj
Pandit Nathuram Premi Research Series Volume 14
Published in 2007, 2009, 2013

In reprint

Life and Stories of the Jain Saviour Parshvanatha
{English}
An English tr. of Acarya Bhavadeva's Parshvacaritram
by Prof Dr Maurice Bloomfield
Pandit Nathuram Premi Research Series Volume 15
Published in 2008

In reprint 

Tattvasara
{Prakrit text + English translation}
Prakrit text by Acarya Devasena
English tr. by Manish Modi
Pandit Nathuram Premi Research Series Volume 16
Published in 2013

In reprint 

The Apabhramsha of Svayambhudeva’s Paumacariu
{English}
By Dr Eva de Clercq
Pandit Nathuram Premi Research Series Volume 17
Published in 2010

₹ 180  

Jainism and the Definition of Religion
{English}
By Dr Piotr Balcerowicz
Pandit Nathuram Premi Research Series Volume 18
Published in 2009

₹ 50  

Dravyasamgraha
Compendium of Substances
{Prakrit text + English translation}
Prakrit text by Acarya Nemicandra
English tr. by Prof Dr Nalini Balbir
Pandit Nathuram Premi Research Series Volume 19
Published in 2010, 2013

₹ 50  

Tattvarthasutra
{Sanskrit text + Hindi & English translations}
Sanskrit text by Acarya Prabhacandra
Hindi tr. by Dr Jaykumar Jalaj, English tr. by Anish Shah
Pandit Nathuram Premi Research Series Volume 20
Published in 2012

₹ 30   

Rayanasara
{Prakrit text + Hindi translation}
Prakrit text by Acarya Kundakunda
Hindi tr. by Dr Jaykumar Jalaj
Pandit Nathuram Premi Research Series Volume 21
Published in 2011

₹ 50

Jainism: An Eternal Pilgrimage
{English}
By Bal Patil
Pandit Nathuram Premi Research Series Volume 23
Published in 2008, 2011

In reprint

Dravyasamgraha
{Prakrit text + Hindi translation}
Prakrit text by Acarya Nemicandra
Hindi tr. by Dr Jaykumar Jalaj
Pandit Nathuram Premi Research Series Volume 24
Published in 2009

₹ 30  

Parshvanathacaritram
Sanskrit text by Acarya Vadiraja
Pandit Nathuram Premi Research Series Volume 25

In press   

Parshvacaritram: The Life of Parshva
{Sanskrit text + English translation}
Sanskrit text by Acarya Gunabhadra
English tr. by Prof Dr Willem Bollée
Pandit Nathuram Premi Research Series Volume 26
Published in 2008

₹ 60   

Jain Sahitya aur Itihas
{Hindi}
By Pt. Nathuram Premi
Published in 1942, 1956

In reprint

Understanding Jainism
{English}
By Prof Dr Lawrence A. Babb
Pandit Nathuram Premi Research Series Volume 27
Published in 2016

₹ 250

Tales of Atonement
Stories from Malayagiri's Commentary on the Vyavahara Bhashya
{Prakrit text + English translation}
English tr. by Prof Dr Willem Bollée
Pandit Nathuram Premi Research Series Volume 28
Published in 2008

₹ 300   

A Handbook on the Three Jewels of Jainism
THE YOGASHASTRA OF HEMACANDRA
A 12th Century Jain Treatise on Yoga
{Sanskrit text + English translation}
Sanskrit text by Acarya Hemacandra
English tr. by Prof Dr Olle Qvarnström
Pandit Nathuram Premi Research Series Volume 29
Published in 2012, 2012, 2012, 2012, 2013, 2013

₹ 700  

Samayasara
{Prakrit text + Hindi translation}
Prakrit text by Acarya Kundakunda
Hindi translation by Dr Jaykumar Jalaj
Pandit Nathuram Premi Research Series Volume 30
Published in 2012, 2012

₹ 80     

Dhyanabattisi
32 Steps to Liberation
{Braj text + English translation}
Braj text by Banarasidas
English tr. by Jerome Petit
Pandit Nathuram Premi Research Series Volume 31
Published in 2010

In reprint  

Tattvarthasutra
Aspects of Reality in Jainism, through the Eyes of a Scientist
{Sanskrit text + English translation & gloss}
Sanskrit text by Acarya Umasvati
English tr. and commentary by Dr Duli Chandra Jain
Preface by Prof Padmanabh S. Jaini
Pandit Nathuram Premi Research Series Volume 32
Published in 2012, 2013

₹ 600  

Svarupa-Sambodhana
Right Instruction on the Nature of the Soul
{Sanskrit text + English translation & gloss}
Sanskrit text by Acarya Akalanka
English tr., notes and introduction by Nagin J. Shah
Pandit Nathuram Premi Research Series Volume 33
Published in 2011

₹ 50   

Tattvajnana Dvatrimshika
{Sanskrit text + English translation}
Sanskrit text by Acarya Siddhasena Divakara
English tr. by  Manish Modi
Pandit Nathuram Premi Research Series Volume 34
Published in 2013

₹ 20

Three Prakrit Grammars
{Sanskrit text + English translation & gloss}
By Saartje Verbeke
Pandit Nathuram Premi Research Series Volume 35
Published in 2010

₹ 300  

Ishtopadesha
Beneficial Teachings
{Sanskrit text + Gujarati tr. + English translation}
Sanskrit text by Acarya Pujyapada
Gujarati tr. by Pravina Mehta, English tr. by Manish Modi
Pandit Nathuram Premi Research Series Volume 36
Published in 2010, 2013

₹ 20    

Bhaktamara Stotra
{Sanskrit text + Hindi translation & gloss + English translation}
Sanskrit text by Acarya Manatunga
Hindi poetic tr. and gloss by Pt Nathuram Premi, English tr. by  Manish Modi
Pandit Nathuram Premi Research Series Volume 37
Published in 2012, 2013

In reprint

Mrityu Mahotsava
A Celebration of Death
{Sanskrit text + Hindi, Gujarati & English translations}
Sanskrit text by an Unknown Writer
Hindi tr. by Shreyans Sukhani, Gujarati tr. by Dr Shilpa Vasani,
English tr. by Manish Modi
Pandit Nathuram Premi Research Series Volume 38
Published in 2010

In reprint

Chhahdhala
By Pandit Daulatram
Original text in Braj + Hindi translation
Hindi prose and poetic translations by Dr Jaykumar Jalaj
Pandit Nathuram Premi Research Series Volume 39
Published in 2014, 2014
     
₹ 100

Hridaya Pradipa
Verses to Illumine Your Heart
{Sanskrit text + English translation}
Sanskrit text by an Unknown Writer
English tr. by Manish Modi
Pandit Nathuram Premi Research Series Volume 40
Published in 2013

In reprint

Ratnakarandaka Shravakacara
{Sanskrit text + English translation}
Sanskrit text by Acarya Samantabhadra
English tr.  and commentary by  Prof Dr Willem Bollée
Pandit Nathuram Premi Research Series Volume 41
Published in 2012, 2012

In reprint

Kalyanamandira Stotra
{Sanskrit text + Hindi translation + English translation}
Sanskrit text by Acarya Kumudacandra
Hindi poetic tr. and gloss by Pt Shobhachandra Bharill, English tr. by Manish Modi
Pandit Nathuram Premi Research Series Volume 42
Published in 2013

In reprint

Sadbodha-Candrodaya
{Sanskrit text + English translation}
Sanskrit text by Acarya Padmanandi
English tr. by Manish Modi
Pandit Nathuram Premi Research Series Volume 43
Published in 2014

₹ 25

Other books that we have published

International Journal of Jain Studies, Volume 1 - 3
{English}

In reprint

International Journal of Jain Studies, Volume 4 - 6
{English}
Published in 2011

₹ 800

International Journal of Jain Studies, Volume 7 - 9
{English}
Published in 2014

₹ 700

Christianity and Jainism
An Interfaith Dialogue
{English}
By Prof Padmanabh S. Jaini
Published in 2009

₹ 30

Bhagavan Mahavir ka Buniyadi Chintan
{Hindi}
By Dr Jaykumar Jalaj
Published in 2017 (46th edition)

₹ 34  

The Basic Thought of Bhagavan Mahavir
{English}
By Dr Jaykumar Jalaj
English tr. by Manish Modi
Published in 2017 (14th edition)

₹ 34

Bhagavan Mahavir nu Buniyadi Chintan
{Gujarati}
By Dr Jaykumar Jalaj
Gujarati tr. by Prof. Bhagavati Prasad Upadhyay
Published in 2010

In reprint

Rebirth of the Karma Doctrine
{English}
By Prof Dr Subhash Jain
Published in 2010

₹ 125

Unlimited Horizons
{English}
By Hermann Kuhn
Published in 2010

₹ 285

-----

Dilon ke Rishte
{Hindi}
By Prem Dhavan
Published in 2001

₹ 100

Religious Ethics: A Sourcebook
{English}
By Prof Dr Arthur Dobrin
Published in 2004

In reprint

The Lost Art of Happiness
{English}
By Prof Dr Arthur Dobrin
Published in 2007, 2009

₹ 250

Business Ethics: The Right Way to Riches
{English}
By Prof Dr Arthur Dobrin
Published in 2006, 2008, 2009

In reprint

Spelling God with Two O's
{English}
By Prof Dr Arthur Dobrin
Published in 2009

In reprint

External links
 http://www.mid-day.com/lifestyle/2012/sep/270912-Meet-the-literary-revolutionary.htm
 http://indianexpress.com/article/cities/mumbai/a-publishing-house-thrives-on-a-legacy-of-reform-ushered-in-by-its-founder-2767539/#sthash.4SKmdTxg.dpuf

Book publishing companies of India
Indology
Publishing companies established in 1912
Bookstores of India
1912 establishments in India